Prenesta is a genus of moths of the family Crambidae. The type species  is Prenesta fabialis.

Species
Prenesta anaemicalis (Hampson, 1912)
Prenesta evippealis (Walker, 1859)
Prenesta fenestrinalis (Guenée, 1854)
Prenesta fulvirufalis (Hampson, 1917)
Prenesta ignefactalis (Möschler, 1886)
Prenesta iphiclalis (Walker, 1859)
Prenesta latifascialis (Snellen, 1875)
Prenesta luciferalis (Möschler, 1881)
Prenesta nysalis (Walker, 1859)
Prenesta ornamentalis (Möschler, 1881)
Prenesta philinoralis (Walker, 1859)
Prenesta prosopealis (Walker, 1859)
Prenesta protenoralis (Walker, 1859)
Prenesta quadrifenestralis (Herrich-Schäffer, 1871)
Prenesta rubralis (Hampson, 1898)
Prenesta scyllalis (Walker, 1859)
Prenesta sunialis Snellen, 1875

References

Spilomelinae
Crambidae genera